Markus Fuchs (born 14 November 1995) is an Austrian sprinter. He represented his country at two outdoor and three indoor European Championships.

International competitions

Personal bests
Outdoor
100 metres – 10.15 (2022)
200 metres – 20.84 (-1.0 m/s, Weinheim 2018)
Indoor
60 metres – 6.62 (Linz 2020)
200 metres – 21.45 (Vienna 2019)

References

1995 births
Living people
Austrian male sprinters
Athletes (track and field) at the 2015 European Games
European Games gold medalists for Austria
European Games medalists in athletics
Competitors at the 2017 Summer Universiade
Competitors at the 2019 Summer Universiade